Hollingsworth House is a historic home located at Indianapolis, Marion County, Indiana.  It was built in 1854, and is a two-story, five bay, Federal style frame dwelling.  A seven-room addition was constructed in 1906 or 1908.  The front facade features a two-story, full width, portico.

It was added to the National Register of Historic Places in 1977.

References

Houses on the National Register of Historic Places in Indiana
Federal architecture in Indiana
Houses completed in 1854
Houses in Indianapolis
National Register of Historic Places in Indianapolis